Luge at the 1976 Winter Olympics consisted of three events at Olympic Sliding Centre Innsbruck.  The competition took place between 4 and 7 February 1976.

Medal summary

Medal table

Germany dominated the medal table with eight medals (with an exception of an Austrian bronze medal), including an East German sweep of the gold medals.

Events

Participating NOCs
Sixteen nations participated in Luge at the Innsbruck Games. Chinese Taipei made their Olympic luge debut.

References

 
1976
1976 Winter Olympics events
1976 in luge